Forshaw Day  (1831–1903) was a Canadian artist known for his landscapes.

Life and work

Forshaw Day was born in London, England in 1831. He studied architecture and design at the Royal Dublin Society in Dublin, Ireland in 1857. He studied architecture and design at the South Kensington School of Art in London, England. Forshaw Day emigrated to Halifax, Nova Scotia at age 32 in 1862.

Early career

Forshaw Day opened a studio on Bedford Row in Halifax, Nova Scotia. He painted pictures and taught painting at the Technological Institute in Halifax, Nova Scotia, from 1862 to 1879. He prepared sets for Garrison theatre productions in Halifax, Nova Scotia. In 1876, Day supplied a panorama, "From Paris to London," for a professional theatre company. 

He worked as a draftsman at the H.M. Naval Yard from 1862 to 1879 in Halifax, Nova Scotia. 

He moved to Kingston, Ontario, where he taught freehand drawing and painting at the Royal Military College of Canada from 1879 to 1897. A number of his paintings are now in the college collection. Day painted in England, Ireland, Switzerland. In Canada, Day painted in the Maritimes, Ontario, British Columbia and the Northwest Territories.

Critical success
Forshaw Day worked in the late 19th century. Day was elected a member of the Ontario Society of Artists
on August 14, 1879. In 1880, he was one of the founding members of the Royal Canadian Academy of Arts and his work was included in their group exhibitions.

Final years
In 1901, members of the Royal Military College of Canada Club raised the Forshaw Day Painting Fund in aid of Prof. Forshaw Day, R.C.A., "in consideration of the friendly relations that always existed between him and the Cadets in attendance at the College, and in view of the fact that his circumstances were such as to appeal to the feelings of all those who had met him at Kingston." A number of his paintings were bought by club members, and an oil painting was donated to the college. He died in Kingston, Ontario, in 1903.

Work
Forshaw Day's body of work includes oils on canvas, watercolours and etchings. His preferred subjects were landscapes and marine seascapes.

Museums
Forshaw Day's work is found in various museums and private collections.

The Royal Military College of Canada has two Forshaw Day paintings, no date, oil on canvas, on display in the Senior Staff Mess, both western scenes of the Rocky Mountains, which have plaques indicating they were gifts to the college from ex-cadets, donated in memory of pleasant days spent out sketching with the professor. One is entitled "On the Bow" whilst the other is untitled. A smaller work, entitled "Lake Ontario Park" is now in storage in Yeo Hall.
Purcell's Cove; Spectacle Island – no date. oil on canvas, Art Gallery of Nova Scotia in Halifax, Nova Scotia 
National Gallery of Canada Library & Archives in Ottawa, Ontario.
Yarmouth County Museum & Archives in Yarmouth, Nova Scotia.

Recognition
Forshaw Island, St Joseph Channel, Algoma, Ontario, Canada was named in honour of late Professor Forshaw Day, Esq., R.C.A sometime Professor of Drawing at the Royal Military College, Kingston c. 1879.

Notes

References
Davenport, Ray Davenport's Art Reference: The Gold Edition 0 No 2005 AskART.com Inc. -
Dunbier, Lonnie Pierson (Editor) The Artists Bluebook 34,000 North American Artists to March 2005 479 No 1948
National Gallery of Canada Catalog of Paintings National Gallery of Canada 271 No 1935
Mallett, Daniel Trowbridge Index of Artists: International-Biographical Two Volumes: Includes 1940 Index 1130 No

19th-century Canadian painters
Canadian male painters
Canadian landscape painters
1837 births
1901 deaths
Academic staff of the Royal Military College of Canada
English emigrants to pre-Confederation Nova Scotia
19th-century Canadian male artists
Members of the Royal Canadian Academy of Arts